Aleš Česen (born 26 April 1982, in Kranj) is a Slovenian climber, mountaineer, mountain guide and entrepreneur.

Climbing career
In 2015, Česen was awarded Piolet d'Or for the ascent of the north face of Hagshu along with Marko Prezelj and Luca Lindič. In 2019, he received the award again for the North ridge of Latok I in 2019 with his climbing partners, Tom Livingstone and Luka Stražar.  In 2017, Česen was awarded Alpinist of the year award, by the Alpine Association of Slovenia.

Personal life

Česen has a PhD in Civil Engineering, and is an IFMGA/UIAGM mountain guide. and climbing instructor. Ales has two sons.

His father is the Slovenian mountaineer, Tomo Česen.

Notable ascents 

 2018. Karakoram – North ridge on Latok I (7145 m / 23 442 ft)

2017. [Kishtwar|Indian Himalaya (Kishtwar)]] – New route on North Ridge of P6013 (6038 m / 19 809 ft)
2017. Indian Himalaya (Kishtwar) – New route on Arjuna (6250 m / 20 505 ft), 2nd ascent of the summit, 1st in alpine style
2017.  Many difficult ice climbs and mixed climbs in Alberta and British Columbia

2016. Nepal, Khumbu – SW ridge on Ama Dablam (6812 m / 22349 ft)
2016. Karakoram – Austrian route on Broad Peak (8051 m / 26 414 ft)
2016. Karakoram – NW ridge on Gasherbrum IV (7925 m / 26 001 ft)

2015. Alaska, Denali National Park – SW ridge on Mt Frances
2015. Alaska, Denali National Park – W couloir on Kahiltna Queen
2015. Alaska, Denali National Park – French route in N face on Mt Hunter

2014. Indian Himalaya (Zanskar) – New route on Lagan (5750 m / 18865 ft), TD-
2014. Indian Himalaya (Zanskar) – New route on Hana's Men North (6300 m / 20669 ft), TD
2014. Indian Himalaya (Zanskar) – New route on Hagshu north face (6657 m / 21840 ft), ED

2008. Charakusa Valley (Karakorum) – Second ascent of the Anderson-House-Prezelj route (ED, 6c, M6, 2200 m) on K7 West (6858 m / 22 500 ft)
2008. Charakusa Valley (Karakorum) – Normal ascent on the Sulu Peak (6050 m / 19 849 ft)
2008. Charakusa Valley (Karakorum) – British route on Nasser Brak (5200 m / 17 060 ft)

2006. Trango Towers (Karakorum) – Normal route on Great Trango Tower (6286 m / 20 623 ft)
2006. Trango Towers (Karakorum) – Chota Badla (Trango Monk, 5850 m / 19 192 ft), second ascent
2006. Trango Towers (Karakorum) – Free ascent on Slovenian route (VI 5.12a/b, M5m 1000m) on Nameless Trango Tower (6251 m / 20 509 ft)
2006. Trango Towers (Karakorum) – Many other shorter routes in the Trango range

2005. Kula Kangri range (Tibet) – Climbed a new route in west face of Karejiang III (6824 m / 22 388 ft)
2005. Kula Kangri range (Tibet) – An attempt on Kula Kangri (7538 m / 24 731 ft). Failed due to bad weather.

2004. Yosemite Valley: Astroman (Washington Column), The Nose (El Capitan), Salathe Wall (El Capitan), Regular NW face (Half Dome) and many more.

2003. Tian Shan - Climbed a new route in south face of Peak Gorky (6050 m / 19 849 ft)
2003. Tian Shan - Climbed the normal route in Khan Tengri (7010 m / 22 999 ft)

References

External links 
 

Living people
1982 births
Ethnic Slovene people
Slovenian mountain climbers
Piolet d'Or winners